Billy Chow Bei-lei (born August 24, 1958) is a Hong Kong-Canadian martial artist, film actor, and retired professional kickboxer. He was the WKA world Welterweight champion from 1984 to 1986, and retired with a professional record of 45-0-8.

On-screen, Chow is best known for his roles as General Fujita in the 1994 film Fist of Legend, and Wong in the 1996 film Tai Chi Boxer.

Kickboxing career

World Kickboxing Association
In the 1980s, Chow was the WKA super welterweight kickboxing champion of the world from 1984 to 1986. His final match was on November 20, 2007, in which he lost via decision to Akarn Sanehha of Thailand.

History and early career

Acting
In the 1980s, Chow played an elite soldier in the 1987 film Eastern Condors alongside Sammo Hung, Yuen Biao and Yuen Woo-ping. Chow played thugs in two Jackie Chan movies: Dragons Forever in 1988, and Miracles in 1989.

In the 1990s, Chow had roles in three Jet Li movies: Fist of Legend in 1994 as General Fujita, Meltdown in 1995 as Kong, and Dr. Wai in "The Scripture with No Words" in 1996 as Chan / Japanese Embassy Guard. Chow played Jade Tiger's Brother in the 1995 film Iron Monkey 2 along with Donnie Yen. Chow played Wong, Great Kick of the North in the 1996 film Tai Chi Boxer along with Jacky Wu.

Retired from acting
On August 26, 2006, Chow retired from acting at the age of 48, after his final film, Dragon in Fury.

Business
Chow was born in Calgary, Alberta, Canada. He currently trains fighters out of Billy's Gym in Hong Kong, and Frank Lee's Muay Thai in Edmonton, Alberta, Canada.

Filmography

Movies

Winner Takes All (1984)
City Hero (1985)
Eastern Condors (1987)
Her Vengeance (1988)
Dragons Forever (1988)
Paper Marriage (1988)
Pedicab Driver (1989)
Miracles (1989)
Into the Fire (1989)
Blonde Fury (1989)
When Fortune Smiles (1990)
Triad Story (1990)
Middle Man (1990)
Magic Cop (1990)
Licence to Steal (1990)
Touch and Go (1991)
Robotrix (1991)
Queen's High (1991)
The Gambling Ghost (1991)
All Mighty Gambler (1991)
Wizard's Curse (1992)
Secret Police (1992)
Kickboxer's Tears (1992)
Escape from Brothel (1992)
Beauty Investigator (1992)
The Street Car Named Desire (1993)
Future Cops (1993)
Once Upon a Time in China IV (1993)
Bloodshed in Nightery (1993)
Romance of the Vampire (1994)
Rock on Fire (1994)
Out Bound Killing (1994)
My Friend Roy (1994)
Gambling Baron (1994)
Fist of Legend (1994)
Tough Beauty and the Sloppy Slop (1995)
Iron Monkey 2 (1995)
Meltdown (1995)
Yes Madam 5 (1996)
Horrible High Heels (1996)
Dr. Wai in "The Scripture with No Words" (1996)
Tai Chi Boxer (1996)
Another Chinese Cop (1996)
18 Shaolin Golden Boy (1996)
Tough Guy (1997)
Tiger Angels (1997)
Super Cops (1997)
Crazy Mission (1997)
97 Aces Go Places (1997)
Young and Dangerous 5 (1998)
Roller Blade Killer (1998)
Fatal Desire (1998)
Death Games (1998)
The Wanted Convict (1999)
Undercover Girls (1999)
City of Darkness (1999)
Unbeatables (2000)
Stand in Between (2000)
The King Boxer (2000)
Gei Xiao Jie Bao Biao (2000)
Mabangis na Lungsod
Camouflage (2000)
Vampire Hunter D: Bloodlust (2000)
Dragon the Master (2002)
Star Runner (2003)
Xiao Tai Ji (2004)
Hero Youngster (2004)
Roaring Dragon, Bluffing Tiger (2006)
Dragon in Fury (2006)

References

External links
Billy's Gym (Chinese Language Website)
Hong Kong Cinemagic list of films

1958 births
Living people
Businesspeople from Calgary
Businesspeople from Edmonton
Male actors from Calgary
Male actors from Edmonton
Canadian male film actors
Canadian male kickboxers
Canadian people of Hong Kong descent
Canadian sports businesspeople
Canadian male stage actors
Hong Kong male kickboxers
Sportspeople from Calgary
Sportspeople from Edmonton
Welterweight kickboxers
Canadian-born Hong Kong artists